Ruby Canyon is a roughly 25 mile (40 km) long canyon on the Colorado River located on the Colorado-Utah border in the western United States, and is a popular destination for rafting.  The canyon takes its name from the red sandstone cliffs which line the canyon walls.

The only access to the canyon outside of rafting is provided by Union Pacific Railroad (formerly Denver and Rio Grande Western Railroad) between Mack, Colorado, and Westwater, Utah.  Amtrak's California Zephyr follows this route through Ruby Canyon between Grand Junction, Colorado, and Thompson Springs, Utah.   A popular attraction along the route are the words "Utah | Colorado" painted on the canyon wall at the border between the two states next to the Utaline Siding.

Colorado River
Protected areas of Mesa County, Colorado
Canyons and gorges of Grand County, Utah
Canyons and gorges of Colorado
Canyons and gorges of Utah
Denver and Rio Grande Western Railroad
Bureau of Land Management areas in Colorado